The 1957–58 NBA season was the Detroit Pistons' tenth season in the NBA and first season in the city of Detroit. 

The new Detroit Pistons played home games at Olympia Stadium, home of the Detroit Red Wings, and struggled to find a footing in their new hometown.  Team owner Fred Zollner provided the team with their own aircraft to travel for road games, but the NBA responded with a difficult travel schedule, especially during the winter, as the Pistons could avoid commercial air delays.  The Pistons went 33–39 (.458) during the season, tied for second in the Western Division, with the Cincinnati Royals, eight games behind the St. Louis Hawks, but were awarded the second seed on tie-breakers. 

The Pistons defeated the Royals in two straight games in the West Semifinal series, but lost the West Finals to the Hawks 4-1.  The team was led by forward George Yardley (27.8 ppg, 10.7 rpg, NBA All-Star) and guards Gene Shue (15.6 ppg, NBA All-Star) and Dick McGuire (8.1 ppg, 6.6 apg, NBA All-Star).

Regular season

Season standings

x – clinched playoff spot

Record vs. opponents

Game log

Playoffs

|- align="center" bgcolor="#ccffcc"
| 1
| March 15
| Cincinnati
| W 100–83
| George Yardley (29)
| Detroit Olympia
| 1–0
|- align="center" bgcolor="#ccffcc"
| 2
| March 16
| @ Cincinnati
| W 124–104
| Yardley, Dukes (24)
| Cincinnati Gardens
| 2–0
|-

|- align="center" bgcolor="#ffcccc"
| 1
| March 19
| @ St. Louis
| L 111–114
| Gene Shue (29)
| Kiel Auditorium7,328
| 0–1
|- align="center" bgcolor="#ffcccc"
| 2
| March 22
| St. Louis
| L 96–99
| George Yardley (26)
| University of Detroit Fieldhouse
| 0–2
|- align="center" bgcolor="#ccffcc"
| 3
| March 23
| @ St. Louis
| W 109–89
| George Yardley (31)
| Kiel Auditorium9,321
| 1–2
|- align="center" bgcolor="#ffcccc"
| 4
| March 25
| St. Louis
| L 101–145
| Yardley, Dukes (16)
| Detroit Olympia
| 1–3
|- align="center" bgcolor="#ffcccc"
| 5
| March 27
| @ St. Louis
| L 96–120
| Yardley, Dukes (18)
| Kiel Auditorium7,661
| 1–4
|-

Awards and records
George Yardley, All-NBA First Team

References

Detroit Pistons seasons
Detroit